Anglo-Catholicism is the tendency within the Anglican Communion that emphasizes the church's Catholic heritage.

It may also refer to:
the Catholic Church in England and Wales
Roman Catholics who use Anglican-inspired liturgy, in particular former Anglicans; see Personal ordinariate and Pastoral Provision
Anglican–Roman Catholic dialogue
the Anglican Catholic Church, part of the continuing Anglican movement